Asbury Automotive Group is a company based in Atlanta that operates auto dealerships in various parts of the United States. Founded in 1995, it was ranked No. 360 on the 2022 Fortune 500 list.

With 148 dealerships and 198 franchises representing 31 American, European, and Asian brands, it is the third largest automotive retailer in the United States as of March 2022.

History

Asbury Automotive was formed in 1995 by Tom Gibson, a former vice president with Subaru of America.
One of the company's original moves was to form a joint venture with Atlanta-based dealer Jim Nalley before acquiring his 11 dealerships outright in 1997. (Nalley oversaw the stores until his retirement in 2004; his sons currently own dealerships across Alabama, Georgia, and Tennessee.)

Eventually, Asbury would expand out of the Atlanta area, adding St. Louis-based Plaza Motors while acquiring David McDavid’s Texas dealerships, and later the Jacksonville, Fla.-based Coggin Automotive and Tampa, Fla.-based Courtesy Automotive in 1998. A joint venture with the North Carolina-based Crown Automotive Group in 1999 saw Asbury eventually take full ownership of those dealerships, while moving into South Carolina with its outright purchase of the Greenville Automotive Group in 2010. It would also purchase dealerships across Arkansas, Mississippi, and Oregon before later divesting to focus on core markets.

Throughout the latter portion of the 2010s and early 2020s, under CEO David Hult, Asbury would begin a more rapid expansion, moving into the Indianapolis market with its purchase of Hare Automotive and the Bill Estes Automotive Group in 2017 and 2019, respectively. It would also make several single-point purchases to expand its reach across the area, including Terry Lee Honda in Avon, Ind. (renamed Hare Honda) in 2018 and Kahlo Chrysler Dodge Jeep Ram in Noblesville, Ind. in 2019.

In December 2019, Asbury agreed to buy Texas-based Park Place Dealerships, a collection of luxury vehicle dealerships in the Dallas/Fort Worth area, for $1 billion.  On March 24, 2021, it was announced the deal was canceled amid concerns due to the COVID-19 pandemic. However, a modified deal was reached on July 6 of that year which closed on August 24.

In December 2020, Asbury unveiled Clicklane, an online new and used vehicle retailing platform. The company rolled out the platform across its existing dealership base while announcing intents to utilize the brand in markets in which it did not currently own stores.

On Sept. 29, 2021, Asbury purchased the Utah-based Larry H. Miller Dealerships for $3.2 billion, along with its Total Care Auto (TCA) vehicle protection plan business. The company divested 7 Toyota and Lexus dealerships due to manufacturer guidelines. Asbury announced plans to roll out TCA to its non-Larry H. Miller “legacy” stores, while in a similar fashion integrating the Clicklane platform to the Larry H. Miller dealerships.

In December 2021, Asbury acquired Stevinson Automotive Group in the Denver, Colorado area.

Divisions

See also
 List of S&P 600 companies

References

External links
 
 Asbury Automotive Group (official corporate website)
 Asbury Automotive Group SEC Filings Feb. 2015
 Asbury Automotive Group SEC Filings Feb. 2016

Companies listed on the New York Stock Exchange
Retail companies established in 1995
Companies based in Duluth, Georgia
Auto dealerships of the United States